Admiral Kingsmill was launched in Spain in 1786 under another name, and was repaired in 1795 and 1798. She first appeared in Lloyd's Register in 1798 with J. Burke, master, Callahan, owner, and trade Cork—Martinique. Admiral Kingsmill, Burk, master, was sailing from Jamaica to London when the French privateer  captured her in April 1799.

Courageaux also captured three other vessels that month: , Mary, and Fanny. Courageaux sent her prizes into Passages; the captains were returned to Poole. The French papers reported that Mary and three other vessels from a convoy from the West Indies, prizes to Courageux, had arrived in France on the 17th of April.

Citations

1786 ships
Ships built in Spain
Captured ships
Age of Sail merchant ships of England